Veniam was a technology startup focused on building large WiFi mesh networks using moving vehicles like city buses or taxis.
The company is headquartered in Mountain View, California and was founded in 2012. The Company received 4.9 million dollars in 2014 in a funding round from True Ventures, USV and Cane Investments. Veniam's technology is being used in Porto's city buses with about 230,000 users with onboard units (OBUs) installed on over 600 buses, taxis and garbage trucks.  They aim to equip many moving things with wireless hotspots creating a mesh that could be used to build sensors to turn the city smarter.Each vehicle is equipped with a NetRider, a multi network unit with Wi-Fi (802.11p), DSRC, GPS and 4G/LTE connectivity. Veniam was acquired by Nexar in 2022.

Company
Veniam was founded by João Barros, its CEO, Roy Russell, former Zipcar CTO, Susana Sargento, a professor at the University of Aveiro, and Robin Chase, former CEO of Zipcar and Buzzcar.

Products
Veniam Platform

Awards
2018 named Best Connected Product/Service at TU Automotive 
2017 ScaleUp Portugal Award Tech Winner
2017 Telecom Council Spiffy Winner - San Andreas Award for the Most Disruptive Technology 
2017 CNBC 50 Disruptors - list of companies whose "innovations are changing the world.” 
Winner of TU Automotive Best Auto Mobility Product/Service 2016
2016 Best Auto Mobility Product/Service Winner by TU Automotive
2016 CNBC 50 Disruptors - list of companies whose "innovations are revolutionizing the business landscape.” 
Winner of the “Best New Venture” at the WBA 2015 Wi-Fi Industry Awards
Winner of WBA Scale Up Award 2015 for the outstanding innovation and solutions brought to market 
Winner of the 2015 Red Herring Top 100 Award
Winner of the NOS Innovation Award 2015 
Winner of the Portuguese Venture Competition “Building Global Innovators” (ISCTE–IUL; MIT Portugal)
Most Likely to Succeed Idea within the Cable Industry at CableLabs’ Innovation Showcase
Named 2015 Gartner “Cool Vendor” in Smart Cities
Named FierceWireless “Fierce 15” Top Wireless Company List of 2015

Investors
Cane Investments
Cisco Investments
Liberty Global
Orange Digital Ventures
True Ventures
USV
Verizon Ventures
Yamaha Motor Ventures And Laboratory Silicon Valley

Institutional Partners
Carnegie Mellon Portugal
European Union
Instituto de Telecomunicações
ISCTE – University Institute of Lisbon
MIT Portugal
O NOVO NORTE
Quadro de Referência Estratégico Nacional
University of Aveiro
University of Porto
University Technology Entreprise Network Portugal

References 

American companies established in 2012
Companies based in Mountain View, California
Internet of things companies
Mesh networking